Darinuiyeh (also Romanized as Dārīnū’īyeh; also known as Ārīnū’īyeh and Dārmīnū’īyeh) is a village in Zeydabad Rural District, in the Central District of Sirjan County, Kerman Province, Iran. At the 2006 census, its population was 278, in 65 families.

References 

Populated places in Sirjan County